The 2017 season is Santos Futebol Clube's 105th season in existence and the club's fifty-eighth consecutive season in the top flight of Brazilian football. As well as the Campeonato Brasileiro, the club competes in the Copa do Brasil, the Campeonato Paulista and also in Copa Libertadores.

Players

Squad information

Source: SantosFC.com.br (for appearances and goals), Wikipedia players' articles (for international appearances and goals), FPF (for contracts)

Copa Libertadores squad

2

1

1
2

1

2

1: Matheus Ribeiro, Matheus Oliveira and Yan were unregistered, with Caju, Emiliano Vecchio and Alison being registered in their places, respectively.
2: Vitor Bueno, Rodrigão and Thiago Maia were unregistered, with Nilmar, Orinho and Gustavo Henrique being registered in their places, respectively.

Appearances and goals

Last updated: 4 December 2017
Source: Match reports in Competitive matches, Soccerway

Goalscorers

Last updated: 4 December 2017
Source: Match reports in Competitive matches

Disciplinary record

As of 4 December 2017
Source: Campeonato Paulista 
 = Number of bookings;  = Number of sending offs after a second yellow card;  = Number of sending offs by a direct red card.

National team call-ups

Suspensions served

Injuries

Squad number changes

Managers

Transfers

Transfers in

Loans in

Transfers out

Loans out

Contracts

Pre-season and friendlies

Sources:

Competitions

Overall

Detailed overall summary

{| class="wikitable" style="text-align: center"
|-
!
!Total
! Home
! Away
|-
|align=left| Games played          || 66 || 33 || 33
|-
|align=left| Games won             || 33 || 22 || 11
|-
|align=left| Games drawn           || 17 || 4 || 13
|-
|align=left| Games lost            || 16 || 7 || 9
|-
|align=left| Biggest win           || 6–2 v Linense4–0 v Sporting Cristal || 6–2 v Linense4–0 v Sporting Cristal || 4–1 v São Bernardo
|-
|align=left| Biggest loss          || 1–3 v São Paulo1–3 v Bahia0–2 v Botafogo0–2 v Corinthians0–2 v Flamengo0–2 v Chapecoense || 1–3 v São Paulo || 1–3 v Bahia0–2 v Botafogo0–2 v Corinthians0–2 v Flamengo0–2 v Chapecoense
|-
|align=left| Clean sheets          || 28 || 17 || 11
|-
|align=left| Goals scored          || 91 || 55 || 36
|-
|align=left| Goals conceded        || 59 || 26 || 33
|-
|align=left| Goal difference       || +32 || +29 || +3
|-
|-
|-
|align=left| Yellow cards         || 143 || 71 || 72
|-
|align=left| Red cards       || 8 || 3 || 5
|-
|align=left| Most appearances  || align=center| Lucas Veríssimo (59) ||align=center| Lucas Veríssimo (30) ||align=center| Lucas Veríssimo (29)Bruno Henrique (29)
|-
|align=left| Top scorer   || align=center| Bruno Henrique (18) ||align=center| Ricardo Oliveira (9)Copete (9) ||align=center| Bruno Henrique (10)
|-
|align=left|Worst discipline      || align=center| Bruno Henrique  (3)  (11) ||align=center|David Braz  (1)  (8)||align=center| Bruno Henrique  (2)  (6)
|-
|align=left| Points               || 116/198 (%) || 70/99 (%) || 46/99 (%)
|-
|align=left| Winning rate         || % || % || %
|-

Campeonato Brasileiro

Results summary

Results by round

League table

Matches 

Source:

Copa do Brasil

Round of 16

Quarter-finals

Campeonato Paulista

Results summary

Group stage

Matches

Knockout stage

Quarter-final

Copa Libertadores

Group stage

Knockout stage

Round of 16

Quarter-finals

References

Notes

External links
Official Site 
Official YouTube Channel 

2017
Santos F.C.